In probability theory and related fields, a stochastic or random process is a mathematical object usually defined as a family of random variables. Stochastic processes are widely used as mathematical models of systems and phenomena that appear to vary in a random manner. Examples include the growth of a bacterial population, an electrical current fluctuating due to thermal noise, or the movement of a gas molecule. Stochastic processes have applications in many disciplines such as biology, chemistry, ecology, neuroscience, physics, image processing, signal processing, control theory,  information theory, computer science, cryptography and telecommunications. Furthermore, seemingly random changes in financial markets have motivated the extensive use of stochastic processes in finance.

Applications and the study of phenomena have in turn inspired the proposal of new stochastic processes. Examples of such stochastic processes include the Wiener process or Brownian motion process, used by Louis Bachelier to study price changes on the Paris Bourse, and the Poisson process, used by A. K. Erlang to study the number of phone calls occurring in a certain period of time. These two stochastic processes are considered the most important and central in the theory of stochastic processes, and were discovered repeatedly and independently, both before and after Bachelier and Erlang, in different settings and countries.

The term random function is also used to refer to a stochastic or random process, because a stochastic process can also be interpreted as a random element in a function space. The terms stochastic process and random process are used interchangeably, often with no specific mathematical space for the set that indexes the random variables. But often these two terms are used when the random variables are indexed by the integers or an interval of the real line. If the random variables are indexed by the Cartesian plane or some higher-dimensional Euclidean space, then the collection of random variables is usually called a random field instead. The values of a stochastic process are not always numbers and can be vectors or other mathematical objects.

Based on their mathematical properties, stochastic processes can be grouped into various categories, which include random walks, martingales, Markov processes, Lévy processes, Gaussian processes, random fields, renewal processes, and branching processes. The study of stochastic processes uses mathematical knowledge and techniques from probability, calculus, linear algebra, set theory, and topology as well as branches of mathematical analysis such as real analysis, measure theory, Fourier analysis, and functional analysis. The theory of stochastic processes is considered to be an important contribution to mathematics and it continues to be an active topic of research for both theoretical reasons and applications.

Introduction
A stochastic or random process can be defined as a collection of random variables that is indexed by some mathematical set, meaning that each random variable of the stochastic process is uniquely associated with an element in the set. The set used to index the random variables is called the index set. Historically, the index set was some subset of the real line, such as the natural numbers, giving the index set the interpretation of time. Each random variable in the collection takes values from the same mathematical space known as the state space. This state space can be, for example, the integers, the real line or -dimensional Euclidean space. An increment is the amount that a stochastic process changes between two index values, often interpreted as two points in time. A stochastic process can have many outcomes, due to its randomness, and a single outcome of a stochastic process is called, among other names, a sample function or realization.

Classifications
A stochastic process can be classified in different ways, for example, by its state space, its index set, or the dependence among the random variables. One common way of classification is by the cardinality of the index set and the state space.

When interpreted as time, if the index set of a stochastic process has a finite or countable number of elements, such as a finite set of numbers, the set of integers, or the natural numbers, then the stochastic process is said to be in discrete time. If the index set is some interval of the real line, then time is said to be continuous. The two types of stochastic processes are respectively referred to as discrete-time and continuous-time stochastic processes. Discrete-time stochastic processes are considered easier to study because continuous-time processes require more advanced mathematical techniques and knowledge, particularly due to the index set being uncountable. If the index set is the integers, or some subset of them, then the stochastic process can also be called a random sequence.

If the state space is the integers or natural numbers, then the stochastic process is called a discrete or integer-valued stochastic process. If the state space is the real line, then the stochastic process is referred to as a real-valued stochastic process or a process with continuous state space. If the state space is -dimensional Euclidean space, then the stochastic process is called a -dimensional vector process or -vector process.

Etymology
The word stochastic in English was originally used as an adjective with the definition "pertaining to conjecturing", and stemming from a Greek word meaning "to aim at a mark, guess", and the Oxford English Dictionary gives the year 1662 as its earliest occurrence. In his work on probability Ars Conjectandi, originally published in Latin in 1713, Jakob Bernoulli used the phrase "Ars Conjectandi sive Stochastice", which has been translated to "the art of conjecturing or stochastics". This phrase was used, with reference to Bernoulli, by Ladislaus Bortkiewicz who in 1917 wrote in German the word stochastik with a sense meaning random. The term stochastic process first appeared in English in a 1934 paper by Joseph Doob. For the term and a specific mathematical definition, Doob cited another 1934 paper, where the term stochastischer Prozeß was used in German by Aleksandr Khinchin, though the German term had been used earlier, for example, by Andrei Kolmogorov in 1931.

According to the Oxford English Dictionary, early occurrences of the word random in English with its current meaning, which relates to chance or luck, date back to the 16th century, while earlier recorded usages started in the 14th century as a noun meaning "impetuosity, great speed, force, or violence (in riding, running, striking, etc.)". The word itself comes from a Middle French word meaning "speed, haste", and it is probably derived from a French verb meaning "to run" or "to gallop". The first written appearance of the term random process pre-dates stochastic process, which the Oxford English Dictionary also gives as a synonym, and was used in an article by Francis Edgeworth published in 1888.

Terminology
The definition of a stochastic process varies, but a stochastic process is traditionally defined as a collection of random variables indexed by some set. The terms random process and stochastic process are considered synonyms and are used interchangeably, without the index set being precisely specified. Both "collection", or "family" are used while instead of "index set", sometimes the terms "parameter set" or "parameter space" are used.

The term random function is also used to refer to a stochastic or random process, though sometimes it is only used when the stochastic process takes real values. This term is also used when the index sets are mathematical spaces other than the real line, while the terms stochastic process and random process are usually used when the index set is interpreted as time, and other terms are used such as random field when the index set is -dimensional Euclidean space  or a manifold.

Notation

Examples

Bernoulli process

One of the simplest stochastic processes is the Bernoulli process, which is a sequence of independent and identically distributed (iid) random variables, where each random variable takes either the value one or zero, say one with probability  and zero with probability . In other words, a Bernoulli process is a sequence of iid Bernoulli random variables, where each coin flip is an example of a Bernoulli trial.

Random walk

Random walks are stochastic processes that are usually defined as sums of iid random variables or random vectors in Euclidean space, so they are processes that change in discrete time. But some also use the term to refer to processes that change in continuous time, particularly the Wiener process used in finance, which has led to some confusion, resulting in its criticism. There are other various types of random walks, defined so their state spaces can be other mathematical objects, such as lattices and groups, and in general they are highly studied and have many applications in different disciplines.

A classic example of a random walk is known as the simple random walk, which is a stochastic process in discrete time with the integers as the state space, and is based on a Bernoulli process, where each Bernoulli variable takes either the value positive one or negative one. In other words, the simple random walk takes place on the integers, and its value increases by one with probability, say, or decreases by one with probability , so the index set of this random walk is the natural numbers, while its state space is the integers. If , this random walk is called a symmetric random walk.

Wiener process

The Wiener process is a stochastic process with stationary and independent increments that are normally distributed based on the size of the increments. The Wiener process is named after Norbert Wiener, who proved its mathematical existence, but the process is also called the Brownian motion process or just Brownian motion due to its historical connection as a model for Brownian movement in liquids.

Playing a central role in the theory of probability, the Wiener process is often considered the most important and studied stochastic process, with connections to other stochastic processes. Its index set and state space are the non-negative numbers and real numbers, respectively, so it has both continuous index set and states space. But the process can be defined more generally so its state space can be -dimensional Euclidean space. If the mean of any increment is zero, then the resulting Wiener or Brownian motion process is said to have zero drift. If the mean of the increment for any two points in time is equal to the time difference multiplied by some constant , which is a real number, then the resulting stochastic process is said to have drift .

Almost surely, a sample path of a Wiener process is continuous everywhere but nowhere differentiable. It can be considered as a continuous version of the simple random walk. The process arises as the mathematical limit of other stochastic processes such as certain random walks rescaled, which is the subject of Donsker's theorem or invariance principle, also known as the functional central limit theorem.

The Wiener process is a member of some important families of stochastic processes, including Markov processes, Lévy processes and Gaussian processes. The process also has many applications and is the main stochastic process used in stochastic calculus. It plays a central role in quantitative finance, where it is used, for example, in the Black–Scholes–Merton model. The process is also used in different fields, including the majority of natural sciences as well as some branches of social sciences, as a mathematical model for various random phenomena.

Poisson process

The Poisson process is a stochastic process that has different forms and definitions. It can be defined as a counting process, which is a stochastic process that represents the random number of points or events up to some time. The number of points of the process that are located in the interval from zero to some given time is a Poisson random variable that depends on that time and some parameter. This process has the natural numbers as its state space and the non-negative numbers as its index set. This process is also called the Poisson counting process, since it can be interpreted as an example of a counting process.

If a Poisson process is defined with a single positive constant, then the process is called a homogeneous Poisson process. The homogeneous Poisson process is a member of important classes of stochastic processes such as Markov processes and Lévy processes.

The homogeneous Poisson process can be defined and generalized in different ways. It can be defined such that its index set is the real line, and this stochastic process is also called the stationary Poisson process. Serving as a fundamental process in queueing theory, the Poisson process is an important process for mathematical models, where it finds applications for models of events randomly occurring in certain time windows.

Defined on the real line, the Poisson process can be interpreted as a stochastic process, among other random objects. But then it can be defined on the -dimensional Euclidean space or other mathematical spaces, where it is often interpreted as a random set or a random counting measure, instead of a stochastic process. In this setting, the Poisson process, also called the Poisson point process, is one of the most important objects in probability theory, both for applications and theoretical reasons. But it has been remarked that the Poisson process does not receive as much attention as it should, partly due to it often being considered just on the real line, and not on other mathematical spaces.

Definitions

Stochastic process

In other words, for a given probability space  and a measurable space , a stochastic process is a collection of -valued random variables, which can be written as:

Historically, in many problems from the natural sciences a point  had the meaning of time, so  is a random variable representing a value observed at time .

There are other ways to consider a stochastic process, with the above definition being considered the traditional one. For example, a stochastic process can be interpreted or defined as a -valued random variable, where  is the space of all the possible functions from the set  into the space . However this alternative definition as a "function-valued random variable" in general requires additional regularity assumptions to be well-defined.

Index set
The set  is called the index set or parameter set of the stochastic process. Often this set is some subset of the real line, such as the natural numbers or an interval, giving the set  the interpretation of time. In addition to these sets, the index set  can be another set with a total order or a more general set, such as the Cartesian plane  or -dimensional Euclidean space, where an element  can represent a point in space. That said, many results and theorems are only possible for stochastic processes with a totally ordered index set.

State space 
The mathematical space  of a stochastic process is called its state space. This mathematical space can be defined using integers, real lines, -dimensional Euclidean spaces, complex planes, or more abstract mathematical spaces. The state space is defined using elements that reflect the different values that the stochastic process can take.

Sample function
A sample function is a single outcome of a stochastic process, so it is formed by taking a single possible value of each random variable of the stochastic process. More precisely, if  is a stochastic process, then for any point , the mapping

is called a sample function, a realization, or, particularly when  is interpreted as time, a sample path of the stochastic process . This means that for a fixed , there exists a sample function that maps the index set  to the state space . Other names for a sample function of a stochastic process include trajectory, path function or path.

Increment
An increment of a stochastic process is the difference between two random variables of the same stochastic process. For a stochastic process with an index set that can be interpreted as time, an increment is how much the stochastic process changes over a certain time period. For example, if  is a stochastic process with state space  and index set , then for any two non-negative numbers  and  such that , the difference  is a -valued random variable known as an increment. When interested in the increments, often the state space  is the real line or the natural numbers, but it can be -dimensional Euclidean space or more abstract spaces such as Banach spaces.

Further definitions

Law
For a stochastic process  defined on the probability space , the law of stochastic process  is defined as the image measure:

so the law of a  can be written as:

The law of a stochastic process or a random variable is also called the probability law, probability distribution, or the distribution.

Finite-dimensional probability distributions

For any measurable subset  of the -fold Cartesian power , the finite-dimensional distributions of a stochastic process  can be written as:

The finite-dimensional distributions of a stochastic process satisfy two mathematical conditions known as consistency conditions.

Stationarity

Stationarity is a mathematical property that a stochastic process has when all the random variables of that stochastic process are identically distributed. In other words, if  is a stationary stochastic process, then for any  the random variable  has the same distribution, which means that for any set of  index set values , the corresponding  random variables

all have the same probability distribution. The index set of a stationary stochastic process is usually interpreted as time, so it can be the integers or the real line. But the concept of stationarity also exists for point processes and random fields, where the index set is not interpreted as time.

When the index set  can be interpreted as time, a stochastic process is said to be stationary if its finite-dimensional distributions are invariant under translations of time. This type of stochastic process can be used to describe a physical system that is in steady state, but still experiences random fluctuations. The intuition behind stationarity is that as time passes the distribution of the stationary stochastic process remains the same. A sequence of random variables forms a stationary stochastic process only if the random variables are identically distributed.

A stochastic process with the above definition of stationarity is sometimes said to be strictly stationary, but there are other forms of stationarity. One example is when a discrete-time or continuous-time stochastic process  is said to be stationary in the wide sense, then the process  has a finite second moment for all  and the covariance of the two random variables  and  depends only on the number  for all . Khinchin introduced the related concept of stationarity in the wide sense, which has other names including covariance stationarity or stationarity in the broad sense.

Filtration
A filtration is an increasing sequence of sigma-algebras defined in relation to some probability space and an index set that has some total order relation, such as in the case of the index set being some subset of the real numbers. More formally, if a stochastic process has an index set with a total order, then a filtration , on a probability space  is a family of sigma-algebras such that  for all , where  and  denotes the total order of the index set .

Modification
A modification of a stochastic process is another stochastic process, which is closely related to the original stochastic process. More precisely, a stochastic process  that has the same index set , state space , and probability space  as another stochastic process  is said to be a modification of  if for all  the following

holds. Two stochastic processes that are modifications of each other have the same finite-dimensional law and they are said to be stochastically equivalent or equivalent.

Instead of modification, the term version is also used, however some authors use the term version when two stochastic processes have the same finite-dimensional distributions, but they may be defined on different probability spaces, so two processes that are modifications of each other, are also versions of each other, in the latter sense, but not the converse.

If a continuous-time real-valued stochastic process meets certain moment conditions on its increments, then the Kolmogorov continuity theorem says that there exists a modification of this process that has continuous sample paths with probability one, so the stochastic process has a continuous modification or version. The theorem can also be generalized to random fields so the index set is -dimensional Euclidean space as well as to stochastic processes with metric spaces as their state spaces.

Indistinguishable
Two stochastic processes  and  defined on the same probability space  with the same index set  and set space  are said be indistinguishable if the following

holds.

Separability
Separability is a property of a stochastic process based on its index set in relation to the probability measure. The property is assumed so that functionals of stochastic processes or random fields with uncountable index sets can form random variables. For a stochastic process to be separable, in addition to other conditions, its index set must be a separable space, which means that the index set has a dense countable subset.

The definition of separability can also be stated for other index sets and state spaces, such as in the case of random fields, where the index set as well as the state space can be -dimensional Euclidean space.

The concept of separability of a stochastic process was introduced by Joseph Doob,. The underlying idea of separability is to make a countable set of points of the index set determine the properties of the stochastic process. Any stochastic process with a countable index set already meets the separability conditions, so discrete-time stochastic processes are always separable. A theorem by Doob, sometimes known as Doob's separability theorem, says that any real-valued continuous-time stochastic process has a separable modification. Versions of this theorem also exist for more general stochastic processes with index sets and state spaces other than the real line.

Independence

Uncorrelatedness
Formally:

.

Independence implies uncorrelatedness

Orthogonality
Formally:

.

Skorokhod space

Such functions are known as càdlàg or cadlag functions, based on the acronym of the French phrase continue à droite, limite à gauche. A Skorokhod function space, introduced by Anatoliy Skorokhod, is often denoted with the letter , so the function space is also referred to as space . The notation of this function space can also include the interval on which all the càdlàg functions are defined, so, for example,  denotes the space of càdlàg functions defined on the unit interval .

Skorokhod function spaces are frequently used in the theory of stochastic processes because it often assumed that the sample functions of continuous-time stochastic processes belong to a Skorokhod space. Such spaces contain continuous functions, which correspond to sample functions of the Wiener process. But the space also has functions with discontinuities, which means that the sample functions of stochastic processes with jumps, such as the Poisson process (on the real line), are also members of this space.

Regularity
In the context of mathematical construction of stochastic processes, the term regularity is used when discussing and assuming certain conditions for a stochastic process to resolve possible construction issues. For example, to study stochastic processes with uncountable index sets, it is assumed that the stochastic process adheres to some type of regularity condition such as the sample functions being continuous.

Further examples

Markov processes and chains

Markov processes are stochastic processes, traditionally in discrete or continuous time, that have the Markov property, which means the next value of the Markov process depends on the current value, but it is conditionally independent of the previous values of the stochastic process. In other words, the behavior of the process in the future is stochastically independent of its behavior in the past, given the current state of the process.

The Brownian motion process and the Poisson process (in one dimension) are both examples of Markov processes in continuous time, while random walks on the integers and the gambler's ruin problem are examples of Markov processes in discrete time.

A Markov chain is a type of Markov process that has either discrete state space or discrete index set (often representing time), but the precise definition of a Markov chain varies. For example, it is common to define a Markov chain as a Markov process in either discrete or continuous time with a countable state space (thus regardless of the nature of time), but it has been also common to define a Markov chain as having discrete time in either countable or continuous state space (thus regardless of the state space). It has been argued that the first definition of a Markov chain, where it has discrete time, now tends to be used, despite the second definition having been used by researchers like Joseph Doob and Kai Lai Chung.

Markov processes form an important class of stochastic processes and have applications in many areas. For example, they are the basis for a general stochastic simulation method known as Markov chain Monte Carlo, which is used for simulating random objects with specific probability distributions, and has found application in Bayesian statistics.

The concept of the Markov property was originally for stochastic processes in continuous and discrete time, but the property has been adapted for other index sets such as -dimensional Euclidean space, which results in collections of random variables known as Markov random fields.

Martingale

A martingale is a discrete-time or continuous-time stochastic process with the property that, at every instant, given the current value and all the past values of the process, the conditional expectation of every future value is equal to the current value. In discrete time, if this property holds for the next value, then it holds for all future values. The exact mathematical definition of a martingale requires two other conditions coupled with the mathematical concept of a filtration, which is related to the intuition of increasing available information as time passes. Martingales are usually defined to be real-valued, but they can also be complex-valued or even more general.

A symmetric random walk and a Wiener process (with zero drift) are both examples of martingales, respectively, in discrete and continuous time. For a sequence of independent and identically distributed random variables  with zero mean, the stochastic process formed from the successive partial sums  is a discrete-time martingale. In this aspect, discrete-time martingales generalize the idea of partial sums of independent random variables.

Martingales can also be created from stochastic processes by applying some suitable transformations, which is the case for the homogeneous Poisson process (on the real line) resulting in a martingale called the compensated Poisson process. Martingales can also be built from other martingales. For example, there are martingales based on the martingale the Wiener process, forming continuous-time martingales.

Martingales mathematically formalize the idea of a fair game, and they were originally developed to show that it is not possible to win a fair game. But now they are used in many areas of probability, which is one of the main reasons for studying them. Many problems in probability have been solved by finding a martingale in the problem and studying it. Martingales will converge, given some conditions on their moments, so they are often used to derive convergence results, due largely to martingale convergence theorems.

Martingales have many applications in statistics, but it has been remarked that its use and application are not as widespread as it could be in the field of statistics, particularly statistical inference. They have found applications in areas in probability theory such as queueing theory and Palm calculus and other fields such as economics and finance.

Lévy process

Lévy processes are types of stochastic processes that can be considered as generalizations of random walks in continuous time. These processes have many applications in fields such as finance, fluid mechanics, physics and biology. The main defining characteristics of these processes are their stationarity and independence properties, so they were known as processes with stationary and independent increments. In other words, a stochastic process  is a Lévy process if for  non-negatives numbers, the corresponding  increments

are all independent of each other, and the distribution of each increment only depends on the difference in time.

A Lévy process can be defined such that its state space is some abstract mathematical space, such as a Banach space, but the processes are often defined so that they take values in Euclidean space. The index set is the non-negative numbers, so , which gives the interpretation of time. Important stochastic processes such as the Wiener process, the homogeneous Poisson process (in one dimension), and subordinators are all Lévy processes.

Random field

A random field is a collection of random variables indexed by a -dimensional Euclidean space or some manifold. In general, a random field can be considered an example of a stochastic or random process, where the index set is not necessarily a subset of the real line. But there is a convention that an indexed collection of random variables is called a random field when the index has two or more dimensions. If the specific definition of a stochastic process requires the index set to be a subset of the real line, then the random field can be considered as a generalization of stochastic process.

Point process

A point process is a collection of points randomly located on some mathematical space such as the real line, -dimensional Euclidean space, or more abstract spaces. Sometimes the term point process is not preferred, as historically the word process denoted an evolution of some system in time, so a point process is also called a random point field. There are different interpretations of a point process, such a random counting measure or a random set. Some authors regard a point process and stochastic process as two different objects such that a point process is a random object that arises from or is associated with a stochastic process, though it has been remarked that the difference between point processes and stochastic processes is not clear.

Other authors consider a point process as a stochastic process, where the process is indexed by sets of the underlying space on which it is defined, such as the real line or -dimensional Euclidean space. Other stochastic processes such as renewal and counting processes are studied in the theory of point processes.

History

Early probability theory
Probability theory has its origins in games of chance, which have a long history, with some games being played thousands of years ago, but very little analysis on them was done in terms of probability. The year 1654 is often considered the birth of probability theory when French mathematicians Pierre Fermat and Blaise Pascal had a written correspondence on probability, motivated by a gambling problem. But there was earlier mathematical work done on the probability of gambling games such as Liber de Ludo Aleae by Gerolamo Cardano, written in the 16th century but posthumously published later in 1663.

After Cardano, Jakob Bernoulli wrote Ars Conjectandi, which is considered a significant event in the history of probability theory. Bernoulli's book was published, also posthumously, in 1713 and inspired many mathematicians to study probability. But despite some renowned mathematicians contributing to probability theory, such as Pierre-Simon Laplace, Abraham de Moivre, Carl Gauss, Siméon Poisson and Pafnuty Chebyshev, most of the mathematical community did not consider probability theory to be part of mathematics until the 20th century.

Statistical mechanics
In the physical sciences, scientists developed in the 19th century the discipline of statistical mechanics, where physical systems, such as containers filled with gases, can be regarded or treated mathematically as collections of many moving particles. Although there were attempts to incorporate randomness into statistical physics by some scientists, such as Rudolf Clausius, most of the work had little or no randomness.
This changed in 1859 when James Clerk Maxwell contributed significantly to the field, more specifically, to the kinetic theory of gases, by presenting work where he assumed the gas particles move in random directions at random velocities. The kinetic theory of gases and statistical physics continued to be developed in the second half of the 19th century, with work done chiefly by Clausius, Ludwig Boltzmann and Josiah Gibbs, which would later have an influence on Albert Einstein's mathematical model for Brownian movement.

Measure theory and probability theory
At the International Congress of Mathematicians in Paris in 1900, David Hilbert presented a list of mathematical problems, where his sixth problem asked for a mathematical treatment of physics and probability involving axioms. Around the start of the 20th century, mathematicians developed measure theory, a branch of mathematics for studying integrals of mathematical functions, where two of the founders were French mathematicians, Henri Lebesgue and Émile Borel. In 1925 another French mathematician Paul Lévy published the first probability book that used ideas from measure theory.

In 1920s fundamental contributions to probability theory were made in the Soviet Union by mathematicians such as Sergei Bernstein, Aleksandr Khinchin, and Andrei Kolmogorov. Kolmogorov published in 1929 his first attempt at presenting a mathematical foundation, based on measure theory, for probability theory. In the early 1930s Khinchin and Kolmogorov set up probability seminars, which were attended by researchers such as Eugene Slutsky and Nikolai Smirnov, and Khinchin gave the first mathematical definition of a stochastic process as a set of random variables indexed by the real line.

Birth of modern probability theory
In 1933 Andrei Kolmogorov published in German, his book on the foundations of probability theory titled Grundbegriffe der Wahrscheinlichkeitsrechnung, where Kolmogorov used measure theory to develop an axiomatic framework for probability theory. The publication of this book is now widely considered to be the birth of modern probability theory, when the theories of probability and stochastic processes became parts of mathematics.

After the publication of Kolmogorov's book, further fundamental work on probability theory and stochastic processes was done by Khinchin and Kolmogorov as well as other mathematicians such as Joseph Doob, William Feller, Maurice Fréchet, Paul Lévy, Wolfgang Doeblin, and Harald Cramér.
Decades later Cramér referred to the 1930s as the "heroic period of mathematical probability theory". World War II greatly interrupted the development of probability theory, causing, for example, the migration of Feller from Sweden to the United States of America and the death of Doeblin, considered now a pioneer in stochastic processes.

Stochastic processes after World War II
After World War II the study of probability theory and stochastic processes gained more attention from mathematicians, with significant contributions made in many areas of probability and mathematics as well as the creation of new areas. Starting in the 1940s, Kiyosi Itô published papers developing the field of stochastic calculus, which involves stochastic integrals and stochastic differential equations based on the Wiener or Brownian motion process.

Also starting in the 1940s, connections were made between stochastic processes, particularly martingales, and the mathematical field of potential theory, with early ideas by Shizuo Kakutani and then later work by Joseph Doob. Further work, considered pioneering, was done by Gilbert Hunt in the 1950s, connecting Markov processes and potential theory, which had a significant effect on the theory of Lévy processes and led to more interest in studying Markov processes with methods developed by Itô.

In 1953 Doob published his book Stochastic processes, which had a strong influence on the theory of stochastic processes and stressed the importance of measure theory in probability.
 Doob also chiefly developed the theory of martingales, with later substantial contributions by Paul-André Meyer. Earlier work had been carried out by Sergei Bernstein, Paul Lévy and Jean Ville, the latter adopting the term martingale for the stochastic process. Methods from the theory of martingales became popular for solving various probability problems. Techniques and theory were developed to study Markov processes and then applied to martingales. Conversely, methods from the theory of martingales were established to treat Markov processes.

Other fields of probability were developed and used to study stochastic processes, with one main approach being the theory of large deviations. The theory has many applications in statistical physics, among other fields, and has core ideas going back to at least the 1930s. Later in the 1960s and 1970s fundamental work was done by Alexander Wentzell in the Soviet Union and Monroe D. Donsker and Srinivasa Varadhan in the United States of America, which would later result in Varadhan winning the 2007 Abel Prize. In the 1990s and 2000s the theories of Schramm–Loewner evolution and rough paths were introduced and developed to study stochastic processes and other mathematical objects in probability theory, which respectively resulted in Fields Medals being awarded to Wendelin Werner in 2008 and to Martin Hairer in 2014.

The theory of stochastic processes still continues to be a focus of research, with yearly international conferences on the topic of stochastic processes.

Discoveries of specific stochastic processes
Although Khinchin gave mathematical definitions of stochastic processes in the 1930s, specific stochastic processes had already been discovered in different settings, such as the Brownian motion process and the Poisson process. Some families of stochastic processes such as point processes or renewal processes have long and complex histories, stretching back centuries.

Bernoulli process
The Bernoulli process, which can serve as a mathematical model for flipping a biased coin, is possibly the first stochastic process to have been studied. The process is a sequence of independent Bernoulli trials, which are named after Jackob Bernoulli who used them to study games of chance, including probability problems proposed and studied earlier by Christiaan Huygens. Bernoulli's work, including the Bernoulli process, were published in his book Ars Conjectandi in 1713.

Random walks
In 1905 Karl Pearson coined the term random walk while posing a problem describing a random walk on the plane, which was motivated by an application in biology, but such problems involving random walks had already been studied in other fields. Certain gambling problems that were studied centuries earlier can be considered as problems involving random walks. For example, the problem known as the Gambler's ruin is based on a simple random walk, and is an example of a random walk with absorbing barriers. Pascal, Fermat and Huyens all gave numerical solutions to this problem without detailing their methods, and then more detailed solutions were presented by Jakob Bernoulli and Abraham de Moivre.

For random walks in -dimensional integer lattices, George Pólya published, in 1919 and 1921, work where he studied the probability of a symmetric random walk returning to a previous position in the lattice. Pólya showed that a symmetric random walk, which has an equal probability to advance in any direction in the lattice, will return to a previous position in the lattice an infinite number of times with probability one in one and two dimensions, but with probability zero in three or higher dimensions.

Wiener process
The Wiener process or Brownian motion process has its origins in different fields including statistics, finance and physics. In 1880, Thorvald Thiele wrote a paper on the method of least squares, where he used the process to study the errors of a model in time-series analysis. The work is now considered as an early discovery of the statistical method known as Kalman filtering, but the work was largely overlooked. It is thought that the ideas in Thiele's paper were too advanced to have been understood by the broader mathematical and statistical community at the time.

The French mathematician Louis Bachelier used a Wiener process in his 1900 thesis in order to model price changes on the Paris Bourse, a stock exchange, without knowing the work of Thiele. It has been speculated that Bachelier drew ideas from the random walk model of Jules Regnault, but Bachelier did not cite him, and Bachelier's thesis is now considered pioneering in the field of financial mathematics.

It is commonly thought that Bachelier's work gained little attention and was forgotten for decades until it was rediscovered in the 1950s by the Leonard Savage, and then become more popular after Bachelier's thesis was translated into English in 1964. But the work was never forgotten in the mathematical community, as Bachelier published a book in 1912 detailing his ideas, which was cited by mathematicians including Doob, Feller and Kolmogorov. The book continued to be cited, but then starting in the 1960s the original thesis by Bachelier began to be cited more than his book when economists started citing Bachelier's work.

In 1905 Albert Einstein published a paper where he studied the physical observation of Brownian motion or movement to explain the seemingly random movements of particles in liquids by using ideas from the kinetic theory of gases. Einstein derived a differential equation, known as a diffusion equation, for describing the probability of finding a particle in a certain region of space. Shortly after Einstein's first paper on Brownian movement, Marian Smoluchowski published work where he cited Einstein, but wrote that he had independently derived the equivalent results by using a different method.

Einstein's work, as well as experimental results obtained by Jean Perrin, later inspired Norbert Wiener in the 1920s to use a type of measure theory, developed by Percy Daniell, and Fourier analysis to prove the existence of the Wiener process as a mathematical object.

Poisson process
The Poisson process is named after Siméon Poisson, due to its definition involving the Poisson distribution, but Poisson never studied the process. There are a number of claims for early uses or discoveries of the Poisson
process.
At the beginning of the 20th century the Poisson process would arise independently in different situations.
In Sweden 1903, Filip Lundberg published a thesis containing work, now considered fundamental and pioneering, where he proposed to model insurance claims with a homogeneous Poisson process.

Another discovery occurred in Denmark in 1909 when A.K. Erlang derived the Poisson distribution when developing a mathematical model for the number of incoming phone calls in a finite time interval. Erlang was not at the time aware of Poisson's earlier work and assumed that the number phone calls arriving in each interval of time were independent to each other. He then found the limiting case, which is effectively recasting the Poisson distribution as a limit of the binomial distribution.

In 1910 Ernest Rutherford and Hans Geiger published experimental results on counting alpha particles. Motivated by their work, Harry Bateman studied the counting problem and derived Poisson probabilities as a solution to a family of differential equations, resulting in the independent discovery of the Poisson process. After this time there were many studies and applications of the Poisson process, but its early history is complicated, which has been explained by the various applications of the process in numerous fields by biologists, ecologists, engineers and various physical scientists.

Markov processes
Markov processes and Markov chains are named after Andrey Markov who studied Markov chains in the early 20th century. Markov was interested in studying an extension of independent random sequences. In his first paper on Markov chains, published in 1906, Markov showed that under certain conditions the average outcomes of the Markov chain would converge to a fixed vector of values, so proving a weak law of large numbers without the independence assumption, which had been commonly regarded as a requirement for such mathematical laws to hold. Markov later used Markov chains to study the distribution of vowels in Eugene Onegin, written by Alexander Pushkin, and proved a central limit theorem for such chains.

In 1912 Poincaré studied Markov chains on finite groups with an aim to study card shuffling. Other early uses of Markov chains include a diffusion model, introduced by Paul and Tatyana Ehrenfest in 1907, and a branching process, introduced by Francis Galton and Henry William Watson in 1873, preceding the work of Markov. After the work of Galton and Watson, it was later revealed that their branching process had been independently discovered and studied around three decades earlier by Irénée-Jules Bienaymé. Starting in 1928, Maurice Fréchet became interested in Markov chains, eventually resulting in him publishing in 1938 a detailed study on Markov chains.

Andrei Kolmogorov developed in a 1931 paper a large part of the early theory of continuous-time Markov processes. Kolmogorov was partly inspired by Louis Bachelier's 1900 work on fluctuations in the stock market as well as Norbert Wiener's work on Einstein's model of Brownian movement. He introduced and studied a particular set of Markov processes known as diffusion processes, where he derived a set of differential equations describing the processes. Independent of Kolmogorov's work, Sydney Chapman derived in a 1928 paper an equation, now called the Chapman–Kolmogorov equation, in a less mathematically rigorous way than Kolmogorov, while studying Brownian movement. The differential equations are now called the Kolmogorov equations or the Kolmogorov–Chapman equations. Other mathematicians who contributed significantly to the foundations of Markov processes include William Feller, starting in the 1930s, and then later Eugene Dynkin, starting in the 1950s.

Lévy processes
Lévy processes such as the Wiener process and the Poisson process (on the real line) are named after Paul Lévy who started studying them in the 1930s, but they have connections to infinitely divisible distributions going back to the 1920s. In a 1932 paper Kolmogorov derived a characteristic function for random variables associated with Lévy processes. This result was later derived under more general conditions by Lévy in 1934, and then Khinchin independently gave an alternative form for this characteristic function in 1937. In addition to Lévy, Khinchin and Kolomogrov, early fundamental contributions to the theory of Lévy processes were made by Bruno de Finetti and Kiyosi Itô.

Mathematical construction
In mathematics, constructions of mathematical objects are needed, which is also the case for stochastic processes, to prove that they exist mathematically. There are two main approaches for constructing a stochastic process. One approach involves considering a measurable space of functions, defining a suitable measurable mapping from a probability space to this measurable space of functions, and then deriving the corresponding finite-dimensional distributions.

Another approach involves defining a collection of random variables to have specific finite-dimensional distributions, and then using Kolmogorov's existence theorem to prove a corresponding stochastic process exists. This theorem, which is an existence theorem for measures on infinite product spaces, says that if any finite-dimensional distributions satisfy two conditions, known as consistency conditions, then there exists a stochastic process with those finite-dimensional distributions.

Construction issues
When constructing continuous-time stochastic processes certain mathematical difficulties arise, due to the uncountable index sets, which do not occur with discrete-time processes. One problem is that is it possible to have more than one stochastic process with the same finite-dimensional distributions. For example, both the left-continuous modification and the right-continuous modification of a Poisson process have the same finite-dimensional distributions. This means that the distribution of the stochastic process does not, necessarily, specify uniquely the properties of the sample functions of the stochastic process.

Another problem is that functionals of continuous-time process that rely upon an uncountable number of points of the index set may not be measurable, so the probabilities of certain events may not be well-defined. For example, the supremum of a stochastic process or random field is not necessarily a well-defined random variable. For a continuous-time stochastic process , other characteristics that depend on an uncountable number of points of the index set  include:
To overcome these two difficulties, different assumptions and approaches are possible.

Resolving construction issues
One approach for avoiding mathematical construction issues of stochastic processes, proposed by Joseph Doob, is to assume that the stochastic process is separable. Separability ensures that infinite-dimensional distributions determine the properties of sample functions by requiring that sample functions are essentially determined by their values on a dense countable set of points in the index set. Furthermore, if a stochastic process is separable, then functionals of an uncountable number of points of the index set are measurable and their probabilities can be studied.

Another approach is possible, originally developed by Anatoliy Skorokhod and Andrei Kolmogorov, for a continuous-time stochastic process with any metric space as its state space. For the construction of such a stochastic process, it is assumed that the sample functions of the stochastic process belong to some suitable function space, which is usually the Skorokhod space consisting of all right-continuous functions with left limits. This approach is now more used than the separability assumption, but such a stochastic process based on this approach will be automatically separable.

Although less used, the separability assumption is considered more general because every stochastic process has a separable version. It is also used when it is not possible to construct a stochastic process in a Skorokhod space. For example, separability is assumed when constructing and studying random fields, where the collection of random variables is now indexed by sets other than the real line such as -dimensional Euclidean space.

See also

Notes

References

Further reading

Articles

Books

External links 
 

 
Stochastic models
Statistical data types